The American halfbeak (Hyporhamphus meeki), also known as Meek's halfbeak, is a halfbeak from the family Hemiramphidae.

Its specific name is in honor of American ichthyologist Seth Eugene Meek (1859-1914).

References

American halfbeak
Taxa named by Bruce Baden Collette
Fish described in 1993